Kathleen McGee is a Canadian stand-up comedian from Edmonton, Alberta. Her performance at the Winnipeg Comedy Festival was nominated for a 2019 Canadian Comedy Award. Her debut full-length album, 2019's Deliciously Vulgar, was produced by Grammy winner Dan Schlissel for his label Stand Up! Records.

Career

Stand-up comedy
McGee started performing stand-up comedy in Edmonton in 2005 after a bad break-up, and quickly became known for her provocative, bawdy and sometimes sexually explicit material, winning the annual Funniest Person With a Day Job competition in 2008 at Edmonton club The Comic Strip. She lived for several years in Vancouver, Toronto, and Los Angeles to advance her career, but by 2018 had settled back in Edmonton.

In 2017, she was a finalist in the SiriusXM  competition Canada's Top Comic.

She was a regular columnist for Canadian magazine BeatRoute in 2015-16, writing the series Been There Done That: Questionable Advice From a Comedian.

In 2016, she was a headliner in the touring show Rape Is Real and Everywhere, in which all the comedians were also survivors of sexual abuse.

She has been a guest panelist twice on the CBC Radio comedy series The Debaters.

Albums
McGee's Stand Up! Records debut Deliciously Vulgar, was released in 2019. Reviewer Richard Lanoie of The Serious Comedy Site called the album "clever, explicit, and extremely funny," and said he felt that McGee's likeable charm helped make her more intense material palatable and funny.

Podcasts
Since 2019, she has co-hosted The Dead Baby Bear Podcast with Canadian comic Sean Lecomber. Previously, she hosted Kathleen McGee is a Hot Mess, which ran for 89 episodes and ended in 2018.

Awards and nominations
McGee was nominated for a 2019 Canadian Comedy Award, in the "Best Taped Live Performance" category, for her show "Hot Mess," recorded at the Winnipeg Comedy Festival.

Discography
Deliciously Vulgar (Stand Up! Records, 2019)

Personal life
She has a tattoo on her arm celebrating February 21, 2017, the day McDonald's began serving all-day breakfast in Canada, and another on her thigh of Cheers star Shelley Long.

References

External links
Official website
Kathleen McGee at Stand Up! Records website

Living people
Canadian stand-up comedians
Canadian women comedians
People from Edmonton
Stand Up! Records artists
Year of birth missing (living people)
Comedians from Alberta